Geoff Hill (born 21 May 1956) is an author, journalist and long-distance motorcycle rider living in Belfast. He is a critically acclaimed author and award-winning feature and travel writer.

He studied at Queen's University Belfast from 1975–1979, where he was editor of The Gown, and graduated with a BA in English Language and Literature.

While at Queen's, he earned a Blue by making his first appearance for the Northern Ireland men's volleyball team. He went on to captain the team at the 1981 Commonwealth Championships and to play for Northern Ireland 122 times, still an Irish record.

After starting his career in journalism on the Tyrone Constitution, Hill was the features and travel editor of the Belfast News Letter from January 1991 – March 2009, then motorcycle columnist for the Irish Times and Sunday Times. He is now a motorcycle columnist for the Daily Mirror, the editor of Microlight Flying magazine and the Daily Telegraph's travel expert on Northern Ireland.

Works
His first travel book, Way to Go (2005), on two motorcycle journeys - from Delhi to Belfast on a Royal Enfield and Route 66 on a Harley Davidson - was published in April 2005. was nominated for UK travel book of the year and has been reprinted six times.

The sequel, The Road to Gobblers Knob (2007), on a ride from Chile to Alaska along the 16,500 miles of the Pan-American Highway, was published in Spring 2007 and became an immediate Waterstone’s best seller. His next book, Anyway, Where Was I? Geoff Hill’s alternative A-Z of the world (2008), was published in October 2008 and also went straight into Waterstone’s best sellers list.

A 2010 work, Oz : around Australia on a Triumph, describes his 15,000 mile motorcycle circumnavigation of Australia with a partner on Highway 1.

In 2013 he wrote In Clancy's Boots, the story of Carl Stearns Clancy, who traveled around the world by motorcycle. Hill recreated Clancy's 1912–1913 circumnavigation of the globe (see ), carrying with him Clancy's original boots, which are now in the National Motorcycle Museum in Anamosa, Iowa, along with Clancy's diaries, photographs, pith helmet and the world's only unrestored 1912 Henderson, the type of motorcycle Clancy rode.

Hill has either won or been shortlisted for a UK Travel Writer of the Year award nine times. He is also a former Irish Travel Writer of the Year and a former Mexican Government European Travel Writer of the Year, and has been Northern Ireland Features Journalist of the Year three times. In 2007 he was NITB Northern Ireland Journalist of the Year.

He is the author of three novels, Smith, of which The Independent on Sunday said: "Lyrical and lunatic... few first novels achieve as much", and which The Times described as "hilarious", Angel Street and The Butler's Son.

Bibliography

Awards
Northern Ireland Tourist Board (NITB) Northern Ireland Journalist of the Year

References

External links
Daily Mirror archive
Bennetts BikeSocial
Microlight Flying magazine
Daily Telegraph guide to Northern Ireland

Long-distance motorcycle riders
Motorcycle touring writers
Writers from Belfast
Travel writers
1956 births
Living people
Alumni of Queen's University Belfast
Male non-fiction writers from Northern Ireland
21st-century writers from Northern Ireland